The 2022 U Sports University Cup was held March 31 – April 3, 2022, in Wolfville, Nova Scotia, to determine a national champion for the 2021–22 U Sports men's ice hockey season. The OUA Champion UQTR Patriotes defeated the Canada West Champion, and top-seeded, Alberta Golden Bears by a score of 5–4 in double overtime.

Host
The tournament was played at Andrew H. McCain Arena on the campus of Acadia University. It was the first full tournament hosted by Acadia following the partially-played, cancelled championship in 2020. This is scheduled to be the first U Sports men's ice hockey championship played since 2019 following two years of cancelled tournaments due to the COVID-19 pandemic in Canada. The tournament was originally scheduled to be played in Halifax, Nova Scotia at the Scotiabank Centre, but was moved to the Acadia University campus due to scheduling conflicts following a postponement of this tournament by two weeks.

Participating teams

Championship bracket

References

External links 
 Tournament Web Site

U Sports men's ice hockey
Ice hockey competitions in Nova Scotia
2021–22 in Canadian ice hockey
Sport in Wolfville, Nova Scotia
2022 in Nova Scotia